Tábor is a town in the South Bohemian Region of the Czech Republic. It has about 33,000 inhabitants and it is the second most populated town in the region. The historic town centre is well preserved and is protected by law as an urban monument reservation.

Administrative parts
The following villages are administrative parts of Tábor:

Čekanice
Čelkovice
Hlinice
Horky
Klokoty
Měšice
Náchod
Smyslov
Stoklasná Lhota
Větrovy
Všechov
Zahrádka
Záluží
Zárybničná Lhota

Etymology
Although the town's Czech name translates directly to "camp" or "encampment", these words were derived from the Tábor's name, and the town was named after the biblical Mount Tabor located in Israel. The town also gave its name to the Taborites, a radical wing of the Hussites. Tábor was initially called Hradiště hory Tábor ("fortified settlement of the Tábor mountain").

Geography

It lies on the river Lužnice.

Tábor is located in the Tábor Uplands. The historic old town is situated on a hill above the river, which was used for the protection of the town.

In the middle of the town lies the Jordán Reservoir, which was created in 1492 and named after the biblical Jordan River. It was originally used for storage of water, but nowadays it is mainly used for recreation. It is the oldest reservoir in Central Europe. There are also many fish ponds in the municipal territory.

History
The area is known to have been settled since the early Iron Age (6th–5th century BC). The next permanent settlement is documented in the Middle Ages. In around 1270, a short-lived settlement called Hradiště (meaning "gord") was founded, which was destroyed most likely in a rebellion against King Ottokar II of Bohemia in 1276.

Tábor was founded in the spring of 1420, probably by Petr Hromádka of Jistebnice and other members of the most radical wing of the Hussites, who became known as the Taborites. Soon after the Taborites were victorious in the Battle of Tábor. The fortified settlement became the base from which the Hussites led their victorious expeditions. After the defeat of the Hussites in the Battle of Lipany, the Taborites reconciled with King Sigismund, and in 1437, it was promoted by Sigismund to a royal town. In 1452, the town surrendered to the troops under the command of the country's steward of George of Poděbrady.

From the end of the 15th century, the rapid development of Tábor occurred, which began to look like a real town and formed into its present form. Most of its landmarks were built in the 16th century. Great fires in 1532 and 1559 destroyed most of the citizens' houses which were usually made of wood, but the fires also became an impetus for further construction development.

In 1547, the town refused to provide military assistance to King Ferdinand I in his campaign against the German Lutherans. Ferdinand I punished Tábor by confiscation of vast lands which were the source of prosperity of the town. After the Battle of White Mountain in 1620 the town did not surrender to the rule of King Ferdinand II and so the Imperial Army under the command of general Marradas began the half-year long siege that ended in November 1621 when the town surrendered mainly due to lack of food. In 1648, the town was stormed and looted by Swedish army. After the Thirty Years' War, a long period of peace occurred and the town recovered. In the mid-17th century, the monks from the Order of Discalced Augustinians were invited to spread the Catholic faith.

Until 1918, "Tabor – Tábor" was part of the Austrian monarchy (the Austrian side after the compromise of 1867), in the district with the same name, one of the 94 Bezirkshauptmannschaften in Bohemia.

Demographics

Economy
The Tábor Hospital is by far the largest employer based in the town. The largest industrial employer is Brisk Tábor, producer of spark plugs. The tradition of this production in Tábor dates back to 1935. 

There is a military base that hosts 42nd Mechanized Batallion of the 4th Rapid Deployment Brigade. Czech Armed Forces Territorial Command headquarters is also located in the town.

Transport
Tábor is a significant transport hub. It lies on the mainline railway linking Prague with České Budějovice and Linz and local branch lines to Písek, Pelhřimov and Bechyně. The Tábor–Bechyně railway, built in 1903, was the first electrified railway line in Austria-Hungary.

The town also lies on the D3 motorway that is part of the European route E55 that connect it with Prague and České Budějovice. The other important road is the I/19 that connect Tábor with Plzeň, Písek, Pelhřimov and the D1 motorway in Humpolec. 

Tábor is also hub for a bus transportation network in the Tábor District and the northern part of the South Bohemian Region with bus terminal constructed just next to a train station.

Sport
After the 2019–20 season, the local football club FC MAS Táborsko was promoted into the second-level Czech National Football League.

Tábor is also equipped with a winter stadium. The local ice hockey club, HC Tábor, plays in the third-level ice hockey league.

Other sport facilities in Tábor include a swimming pool and the Komora sports complex.

The town hosts Cyklokros Tábor, an annual cyclo-cross race that is part of the UCI Cyclo-cross World Cup.

Sights

Though a large part of the ancient fortifications has been demolished, Tábor still preserves many memorials of its past fame. The historical centre is formed by Žižkovo Square and adjacent streets, and is delimited by remains of the town walls. Only very narrow streets lead to it; this rendered the approach to the square more difficult in times of war. Many architecturally valuable burgher houses decorated by frescos, sgraffiti and gables are preserved, and represent almost all architectural styles.

Town fortifications

Major parts of the town fortifications, including the Kotnov Tower and the Bechyňská Gate near the tower, still exist. Kotnov Tower is the remains of a stone castle which was documented in 1370. It is a landmark on the town's skyline, and today it serves as an observation tower.

A labyrinth of tunnels lies under the houses and streets. The townspeople dug cellars under their houses, and these were subsequently interconnected; an approximately -long section of the tunnel system is open to the public and is a part of the Hussite Museum.

Main square

The largest building on the square is the Dean Church of the Transfiguration of Jesus on the Mount Tabor. It was built in 1480–1512 in the style of the Bohemian Renaissance. In the centre of the square there are a Renaissance fountain from 1567–1568, and a statue of Jan Žižka, the greatest of the Hussite leaders. The statue was created in 1884 by Josef Strachovský and replaced a defective statue from 1877 by Josef Václav Myslbek.

The Old Town Hall was built in stages from 1420 to 1521 in late Gothic style. After it was damaged in the Thirty Year's War, it was reconstructed in Baroque style, but in 1878 its late Gothic appearance was restored, and since then no major alterations have been made. Since 1960, its premises have been used for the Hussite Museum and galleries, and the largest and most representative hall is used for important cultural events. The museum contains interesting relics of the Hussite period such as the Altar Wings of Roudníky.

Ecclesiastical buildings

The second church in the historical centre is the Church of Nativity of the Virgin Mary in the complex of Discalced Augustinians Monastery. The monastery complex was built on the site of abandoned houses in 1642–1666. The church has a Classical Baroque facade. At the beginning of the 19th century the monastery was abolished and the building was converted into a prison. Today, the local museum has its headquarters and depository there, and both the monastery and the church are inaccessible.

The former Church of Saints Philip and James is located below the town walls and is the oldest sacral building in Tábor. Its existence was first mentioned in 1377. It was originally a cemetery chapel, rebuilt to a Baroque church after 1744. Today it serves cultural purposes.

The Church of the Assumption of the Virgin Mary in Klokoty is a Baroque pilgrimage church. The church was built in 1700–1714 and in the following years, cloisters and chapels were added. It is one of the most valuable cultural monuments in the region. It still serves religious purposes. The way to it is lined with Stations of the Cross.

Other cultural sights
Měšice Castle is located in Měšice village. It was built in 1545 as a Renaissance fortress and redesigned into the Baroque style in 1699.

Natural sights
In Klokoty, there is the Pod Klokoty Geological Exposition along the Lužnice.

On the east edge of the town, there is a rock formation called Granátová skála ("Garnet Rock"). The rock is a deposit of red garnets that can be as large as hazelnuts and is protected as a natural monument. The majority of the rock was mined and used as construction material.

It was opened in 2015. In 2021, it bred 74 species. In 2021 it had almost 110,000 visitors.

The botanical garden in Tábor was founded in 1866, which makes it the second oldest in the country. It belongs to the neighbouring Secondary Agricultural School. It contains more than 4,000 plants and 400 trees. The seeds from there are sent to more than 400 places in the world. Most of the garden is occupied by an arboretum. There is a small lake and a rock garden. The three glasshouses contains cacti, succulents, orchids, carnivorous plants and many other exotic plants.

Parks
Pod Kotnovem is a park that is placed next to Bechyňská gate and Kotnov tower. Originally, it was an old cemetery but in the 20th century, it was converted into a park after new cemetery was opened in 1921. Some of the gravestones remained here until present.

Husův park started to form in 1871, after the train station was built. It was not reconstructed until 1991, along with some other buildings in the surroundings. The ceremonial opening of the newly reconstructed park was in 1997. At one part of this park, there stands a big monument to Jan Hus by Czech sculptor František Bílek, made in 1928.

U Popraviště is the biggest park in Tábor. The park is built around a former gallows, which was used during World War II. There is a monument to 156 victims of repression by the German Nazi occupiers that was built in 1945–1950, which includes a bronze board with lions and bronze relief board with figures. The rest of the park rose at the end of the 20th century. It contains sculptures, fountains, tree alleys, benches, flower patches and a playground.

Holečkovy sady is a park founded in the 1930s. It is a green ring around the historic core of Tábor named after a writer and translator Josef Holeček. It is located on a hill and it has many paths and stairs made from rocks, lined with large trees. Some smaller monuments are also there – a memorial to Josef Holeček, a white gazebo, cross and two small chapels.

Notable people

Johan Peter Wotapek von Ritterwald (1676–1763), judge
Oskar Nedbal (1874–1930), violinist, composer and conductor
Petr Zenkl (1884–1975), politician
Jiří Traxler (1912–2011), Czech-Canadian jazz pianist and composer
Karel Černý (1922–2014), art director; lived and died here
Bohumil Němeček (1938–2010), boxer, Olympic winner
Rudolf V. Perina (1945–2018), American diplomat
Jiří Balík (born 1953), agroscientist
Jiří Lála (born 1959), ice hockey player
Helena Fuchsová (born 1965), 400m track and field athlete
Radek Dvořák (born 1977), ice hockey player
Jan Šimák (born 1978), footballer
Jana Sedláčková (born 1993), footballer

International relations
Tábor is a part of the Commonwealth of towns with hussite past and tradition, along with other 11 Czech and 6 German municipalities.

Twin towns – sister cities

Tábor is twinned with:
 Dole, France
 Konstanz, Germany
 Nové Zámky, Slovakia
 Orinda, United States
 Škofja Loka, Slovenia
 Wels, Austria

Gallery

References

Further reading
 Augusta, Pavel; Klínková, Hana: Tábor,  (Tábor 2001).

External links

Official tourist portal
Historical photographs of the town
Hussite Museum in Tábor

 
Cities and towns in the Czech Republic
Populated places in Tábor District
1420 establishments in Europe
Populated places established in the 1420s